The Dreaded Summons and Other Misplaced Bills, published on May 15, 2017, is the third collection of children’s short stories written by Lorin Morgan-Richards.

Humor
The book begins with Tina Teatree, a child that along with her cat are neglected by her parents due to their obsession with gadgets, who learns to become independent but forms a habit of weeding that ultimately leaves her stuck in a mystical area of cacti to cope with her family dilemma. The stories move through other unusual experiences from the title story of a friendship between an introvert and a manatee to the delightfully silly misadventures of the Breakfast Hunter who is trying to retrieve a morning coffee.

"Hidden in these bizarre and odd stories are glimmers of heart and soul, and lessons learned. Morgan-Richards' accompanying illustrations fit the quirky feel of his stories perfectly."

Contents
 Tina TeaTree and Her Picky Habit 
 The Breakfast Hunter
 The Dreaded Summons
 The Perplexing Adventure of Fig B. Willingsbee
 Shirley Short
 The Weathering of J.J. Witweather

Audiobook
An audiobook was released in 2018 casting Jason Shepherd as narrator with a special music introduction by Jay Hwang (ButterFly Music) and Jie TS.

References

2017 children's books
Comedy books
2017 short story collections
American picture books
Black comedy books
Children's short story collections